Agonum texanum is a species of ground beetle from the Platyninae subfamily, that is endemic to Texas, United States.

References

Beetles described in 1878
texanum
Endemic fauna of Texas